Kevin Larsen (born 10 May 1986) is a Norwegian footballer who plays left back for Sandefjord. He also has matches for the Norway national under-21 football team.

He previously played for Store Bergan and Runar in his home town Sandefjord, before making his Tippeligaen debut for Lyn in 2005. On 10 April 2005, he made his debut against Fredrikstad, where he scored Lyn's only goal in a 1–1 draw.

On 25 October 2007, Larsen signed a three-year contract with Tromsø.

On 18 February 2011, Larsen signed a three-year contract with Hønefoss.

Career statistics

References

External links
Profile at lyn.no 
Profile at lynfotball.net 

1986 births
Living people
People from Sandefjord
Norwegian footballers
Norway youth international footballers
Norway under-21 international footballers
IL Runar footballers
Lyn Fotball players
Tromsø IL players
Hønefoss BK players
Sandefjord Fotball players
Eliteserien players
Norwegian First Division players
Association football defenders
Sportspeople from Vestfold og Telemark